Zaccio (foaled March 26, 1976-died September 19, 2007) is a deceased racehorse best known for winning champion steeplechaser 3 times from 1980-1982 and being inducted into the National Museum of Racing and Hall of Fame.

Background 
Zaccio was a bright chestnut with a blaze. His sire was able to beat Ninjinsky II. Who was the last horse to win the English Triple Crown.  His mother descends from the legendary Native Dancer.Who has contributed to loads of other champions. Also he won the Preakness and the Belmont.

Racing career 

3-year-old-season
Starting his career, Zaccio ran 9 times as a jumper and won 6 of them with 2 placings in maiden/allowance company.

4-year-old-season
To start the 80s, he began running in the big jump races. He had 7 wins in 10 races. These included the Midsummer Stp. Handicap, Indian the River Stp. Stakes, Lovely night  Stp handicap, and New York Turf Writers Cup. He fell in his last start of the season and did not return for 10 months.

5-year-old-season 
The year started  with 4 straight defeats followed by wins in the American grand national and the Colonial Cup International Stp.

6-year-old season
Like the year before, Zaccio started with a losing streak. This time it was 6 straight. He came back with 4 straight wins, ending the season with the Colonial Cup International Stp.

8 year old season
After being dormant for 22 months, Zaccio lost twice to begin his return. He won his third attempt and then was retired.

After retirement 
Zaccio was inducted into National Museum of Racing and Hall of Fame in 1990. He enjoyed a wonderful retirement and was ridden out with the Essex Fox Hounds for years, much to his jockeys' enjoyment. He was euthanized  because of complications from the infirmities of old age on September 19, 2007.

Pedigree

See also
 List of historical horses

References 

1976 racehorse births
2007 racehorse deaths
Racehorses bred in Kentucky
Racehorses trained in the United States
American steeplechase racehorses
Eclipse Award winners
United States Thoroughbred Racing Hall of Fame inductees
Thoroughbred family 1-c